Rita Mae Brown (born November 28, 1944) is an American feminist writer, best known for her coming-of-age autobiographical novel, Rubyfruit Jungle. Brown was active in a number of civil rights campaigns and criticized the marginalization of lesbians within feminist groups. Brown received the Pioneer Award for lifetime achievement at the Lambda Literary Awards in 2015.

Biography

Early life
Brown was born in 1944 in Hanover, Pennsylvania to an unmarried teenage mother and her mother's married boyfriend. Brown's birth mother left the newborn Brown at an orphanage. Her mother's cousin Julia Brown and her husband Ralph retrieved her from the orphanage, and raised her as their own in York, Pennsylvania, and later in Ft. Lauderdale, Florida. Julia and Ralph Brown were active Republicans in their local party.

Education
Starting in late 1962, Brown attended the University of Florida on a scholarship. In the spring of 1964, the administrators of the racially segregated university expelled her for participating in the civil rights movement. She subsequently enrolled at Broward Community College with the hope of transferring eventually to a more tolerant four-year institution.

Early career
Brown hitchhiked to New York City and lived there between 1964 and 1969, sometimes homeless, while attending New York University where she received a degree in Classics and English. In 1968, she received a certificate in cinematography from the New York School of Visual Arts.

Brown received a Ph.D. in literature from Union Institute & University in 1976 and holds a doctorate in political science from the Institute for Policy Studies in Washington, D.C.

Brown wrote for Rat, an alternative bi-weekly that eventually became New York City's first women's liberation newspaper.

Later career
In 1982, Brown wrote a screenplay parodying the slasher genre titled Sleepless Nights; retitled The Slumber Party Massacre, the producers decided to play it seriously, and it was given a limited release theatrically. Brown is featured in the feminist history film She's Beautiful When She's Angry.

Philosophical and political views
In the spring of 1964, during her study at the University of Florida in Gainesville, she became active in the American Civil Rights Movement. Later in the 1960s, she participated in the anti-war movement, the feminist movement and the Gay Liberation movement. She was involved with the Student Homophile League at Columbia University in 1967 but left it because the men in the league were not interested in women's rights.

She was involved in the Redstockings, but also left the group because of its lack of involvement in lesbian rights. She then went on to join the Gay Liberation Front, where she suggested the formation of an all-lesbian group, since many of the women felt excluded from the feminist movement and the male-led gay liberation movement.

Brown took an administrative position with the fledgling National Organization for Women, but resigned in January 1970 over comments by Betty Friedan seen by some as anti-gay and by the NOW's attempts to distance itself from lesbian organizations. Brown claimed that lesbian was "the one word that can cause the Executive Committee [of NOW] a collective heart attack."

Brown played a leading role in the "Lavender Menace" zap of the Second Congress to Unite Women on May 1, 1970, which protested Friedan's remarks and the exclusion of lesbians from the women's movement. Brown and other lesbians from the Gay Liberation Front created The Woman-Identified Woman, which was distributed at the zap. The group that wrote the manifesto then went on to become the "Radicalesbians".

While doing work for the American Civil Rights Movement, Brown was introduced to consciousness-raising groups, which she incorporated into the organizations she created and the ones she worked in.

In the early 1970s,  she became a founding member of The Furies Collective, a separatist lesbian feminist collective in Washington, DC that held that heterosexuality was the root of all oppression. The women wanted to create a communal living situation for radical feminists. The group purchased two houses, where they lived together and used consciousness raising techniques to talk about things like homophobia, feminism, and child rearing. They believed that being a lesbian was a political act, not just a personal one. Brown was exiled from The Furies after a few months and the group dismantled in 1972, a year after its inception.

When asked if she had ever really come out, she told Time in 2008, I don't believe in straight or gay. I really don't. I think we're all degrees of bisexual. There may be a few people on the extreme if it's a bell curve who really truly are gay or really truly are straight. Because nobody had ever said these things and used their real name, I suddenly became the only lesbian in America. It was hysterical. It was a misnomer, but it's okay. It was a fight worth fighting. Brown also does not consider herself a "lesbian writer" because she believes art is about connection and not about divisive labels. In a 2015 interview for The Washington Post, Brown was asked if she thought awards in gay and lesbian literature were important; she replied: I love language, I love literature, I love history, and I'm not even remotely interested in being gay. I find that one of those completely useless and confining categories. Those are definitions from our oppressors, if you will. I would use them warily. I would certainly not define myself — ever — in the terms of my oppressor. If you accept these terms, you're now lumped in a group. Now, you may need to be lumped in a group politically in order to fight that oppression; I understand that, but I don't accept it.

Honors, decorations, awards and distinctions
Brown received grants from the National Endowment for the Arts and the Massachusetts Arts Council to publish her novel Six of One.

In 1982, Brown was nominated for an Emmy for Outstanding Writing in a Variety or Music Program for I Love Liberty, and again for the ABC mini-series The Long Hot Summer in 1985.

She was co-winner of the 1982 Writers Guild of America Award for I Love Liberty, and the recipient of the New York Public Library's Literary Lion award of 1987.

In 2015, Brown was presented the Pioneer Award for lifetime achievement at the 27th Lambda Literary Awards.

In addition, Brown was nominated for an Audie award, and won both AudioFile Earphones and Publishers Weekly Listen-Up awards.

Brown received an honorary doctorate from Wilson College in 1992.

Personal life
Starting in 1973, Brown lived in the Hollywood Hills in Los Angeles. In 1978, she moved to Charlottesville, Virginia, where she lived briefly with American actress, author, and screenwriter Fannie Flagg, whom she had met at a Los Angeles party hosted by Marlo Thomas. They later broke up due to, according to Brown, "generational differences", although Flagg and Brown are the same age.

In 1979, Brown met and fell in love with tennis champion Martina Navratilova. In 1980, they bought a horse farm in Charlottesville where they lived together until their breakup, over Navratilova's then concern that coming out would hurt her application for U.S. citizenship. Brown still lives on the estate in Charlottesville.

Published works

Poetry
 "Dancing the shout to the true gospel or The song movement sisters don't want me to sing" was included in the 1970 anthology  Sisterhood Is Powerful: An Anthology of Writings from the Women's Liberation Movement, edited by Robin Morgan.
The Hand That Cradles the Rock (1971). 
Songs to a Handsome Woman (1973).

Novels
 Rubyfruit Jungle (1973) 
 In Her Day (1976) 
 A Plain Brown Rapper (June 1976) 
Southern Discomfort (1983) 
 Sudden Death (1984) 
 High Hearts (1987) 
Venus Envy (1994) 
 Dolley: A Novel of Dolley Madison in Love and War (1995) 
 Riding Shotgun (1996) 
Alma Mater (2002)

Runnymede books 

 Six of One (1978) 
 Bingo (1988)  
 Loose Lips (1999)  
 The Sand Castle (2008) 
 Cakewalk (2016)

Mysteries 

Mrs. Murphy Mysteries
The Mrs. Murphy Mysteries include "Sneaky Pie Brown" as a co-author.

Wish You Were Here (1990) 
Rest in Pieces (1992) 
Murder at Monticello (1994) 
Pay Dirt (1995) 
Murder, She Meowed (1996) 
Murder on the Prowl (1998) 
Cat on the Scent (1999) 
Pawing Through the Past (2000) 
Claws and Effect (2001) 
Catch as Cat Can (2002) 
The Tail of the Tip-Off (2003) 
Whisker of Evil (2004) 
Cat's Eyewitness  (2005) 
Sour Puss (2006) 
Puss n' Cahoots (2007) 
The Purrfect Murder (2008) 
Santa Clawed (2008) 
Cat of the Century (2010) 
Hiss of Death (2011) 
The Big Cat Nap (2012) 
Sneaky Pie for President (2012) / — Not a Mrs. Murphy mystery
The Litter of the Law (2013) 
Nine Lives to Die (2014) 
Tail Gait (2015) 
Tall Tail (2016) 
A Hiss Before Dying (2017)
Probable Claws (2018)
Whiskers in the Dark (2019)
Furmidable Foes (2020)
Claws for Alarm (2021)
Hiss and Tell (Scheduled March 28, 2023)

"Sister" Jane Mysteries
Outfoxed (2000) 
Hotspur (2002) 
Full Cry (2003) 
The Hunt Ball (2005) 
The Hounds and the Fury (2006) 
The Tell-Tale Horse (2007) 
Hounded to Death (2008) 
Fox Tracks (2012) 
Let Sleeping Dogs Lie (2014) 
Crazy Like a Fox (2017)
Homeward Hound (2018)
Scarlet Fever (2019)
Out of Hounds (2021)

Mags Rogers Mysteries
A Nose for Justice (2010) 
Murder Unleashed (2010)

Nonfiction
 Starting from Scratch: A Different Kind of Writer's Manual (1988). 
 Rita Will: Memoir of a Literary Rabble-Rouser (1997). 
 Sneaky Pie's Cookbook For Mystery Lovers (1999). 
 Animal Magnetism: My Life with Creatures Great and Small (2009).

Screenplays
 I Love Liberty (1982; TV special)
 The Slumber Party Massacre (1982; feature film)
 The Long Hot Summer (1985; TV movie)
 My Two Loves (1986; TV movie)
 Me and Rubyfruit (1989; short film interpretation of Rubyfruit Jungle)
 Rich Men, Single Women (1990; TV movie)
 The Woman Who Loved Elvis (1993; TV movie)
 Mary Pickford: A Life on Film (1997; documentary)
 Murder She Purred: A Mrs. Murphy Mystery (1998; TV movie)

See also
 Lesbian Poetry

References

External links

 Official website
 
 Interview with Rita Mae Brown by Blase DiStefano in OutSmart magazine (January 1998)
 Video of Rita Mae Brown talking about her book, The Hounds and the Fury'', fox hunting, and animals in general (November 2006)
 Rita Mae Brown papers at the Albert and Shirley Small Special Collections Library, University of Virginia
 Governor for a Day – 1962 account of 17-year-old Brown serving as stand-in for Florida Governor C. Farris Bryant
 She's Beautiful When She's Angry (film website) for 2014 documentary film including interviews with Brown about her activist work
 NPR Interviews with Rita Mae Brown
 

1944 births
Living people
20th-century American novelists
20th-century American women writers
21st-century American novelists
21st-century American women writers
American feminist writers
American mystery writers
American women novelists
American women poets
American women screenwriters
American LGBT novelists
American LGBT poets
American LGBT rights activists
American LGBT screenwriters
Women mystery writers
LGBT people from Pennsylvania
People from Hanover, Pennsylvania
Screenwriters from Pennsylvania
People from Afton, Virginia
People from Charlottesville, Virginia
Screenwriters from Virginia
Fort Lauderdale High School alumni
University of Florida alumni
New York University alumni
School of Visual Arts alumni
Union Institute & University alumni
Lavender Menace members
Broward College alumni